Quoya atriplicina, commonly known as saltbush foxglove, is a flowering plant in the mint family Lamiaceae and is endemic to Western Australia. It is a bushy shrub with its branches and leaves densely covered with a layer of hairs, giving them a greyish appearance. The leaves are broad-elliptic to almost circular in shape and the tube-shaped flowers are pink with purple spots inside.

Description

The flowers are surrounded by bracts and bracteoles which are hairy on the outer surface and glabrous on the inside. The sepal tube is densely hairy on the outside and glabrous on the inside. The lowest lobe is very broad, more or less circular and twice as large as the others. The outside of the petal tube is hairy, although not so hairy as the sepals, and glabrous inside apart from a ring of hairs around the ovary. The four stamens are about the same length as the tube, one pair shorter than the other.

Taxonomy and naming
This species was first formally described in 1859 by Ferdinand von Mueller who gave it the name Chloanthes atriplicina. The description was published in Fragmenta phytographiae Australiae from a specimen collected by Augustus Oldfield near the Murchison River. In 1870, George Bentham changed the name to Pityrodia atriplicina but in 2011, Barry Conn and Murray Henwood changed it back to Quoya atriplicina and published the change in Australian Systematic Botany. The specific epithet (atriplicina) is derived from the name of the saltbush genus, Atriplex.

Distribution and habitat
Saltbush foxglove grows in sand on sandplains mainly between Geraldton and Shark Bay in the Carnarvon, Geraldton Sandplains and Yalgoo biogeographic regions.

Conservation
Quoya atriplicina is classified as "not threatened" by the Western Australian Government Department of Parks and Wildlife.

References

atriplicina
Plants described in 1859
Taxa named by Ferdinand von Mueller